William Henry Pettit (11 January 1881 – 17 December 1966) was an Australian rules footballer who played with Carlton in the Victorian Football League (VFL).

Notes

External links 

Bill Pettit's profile at Blueseum

1881 births
1966 deaths
Australian rules footballers from Melbourne
Carlton Football Club players
People from Kew, Victoria